State Route 218 (SR 218) is a primary state highway in the U.S. state of Virginia.  The state highway runs  from U.S. Route 1 and US 17 Business in Falmouth east to SR 205 in Tetotum.  SR 218 connects suburban communities in Stafford County east of Fredericksburg with rural areas in northern and eastern King George County.

Most of SR 218 in King George County is a Virginia Byway.

Route description

SR 218 begins in Falmouth at the intersection with US 1 (Jefferson Davis Highway) and US 17 Business, which joins US 1 south to cross the Rappahannock River into Fredericksburg and heads west as Warrenton Road to reconnect with US 17 at Interstate 95.  SR 218 heads east as two-lane undivided Butler Road through a suburban area, then expands to a four-lane divided highway prior to the intersection with SR 212 (Chatham Heights Road).  SR 218 continues east as White Oak Road and crosses over CSX's RF&P Subdivision at its junction with the Dahlgren Branch at Dahlgren Junction.  East of the railroad crossing, the state highway reduces to a two-lane undivided highway that connects residential subdivisions and several small communities east of Fredericksburg, including Sullivan, McCarthys Corner, and White Oak, which contains White Oak Church.

After crossing Muddy Creek into King George County, SR 218's name changes to Caledon Road.  After passing through the hamlet of Passapatanzy, the state highway follows a curvilinear alignment through a forested area.  SR 218 passes through the hamlets of Mustoe, Goby, and Osso and passes roads that head north to the Potomac River beach communities of Belvedere Beach, Fairview Beach, and Somerset Beach.  Near the hamlets of Ambar and Hampstead, SR 218 passes along the edge of Caledon Natural Area, a National Natural Landmark that contains old growth forest and is a haven for bald eagles.  At Berthaville, SR 218 joins SR 206 (Dahlgren Road) in a concurrency east to Owens.  In Owens, SR 206 heads east toward Dahlgren while SR 218 turns south as Windsor Drive to an intersection with US 301 (James Madison Parkway).  The state highway curves to the east to cross Upper Machodoc Creek, then turns south onto Tetotum Road.  SR 218 passes through the community of Tetotum before reaching its eastern terminus at SR 205 (Ridge Road) just north of the Westmoreland County line at Pine Hill Creek.

Major intersections

References

External links

Virginia Highways Project: VA 218

218
State Route 218
State Route 218
218